Eotragus is an extinct genus of early bovid. Species belonging to the genus inhabited Europe, Africa, and Asia during the Miocene some 20-18 million years ago. It is related to the modern nilgai and four-horned antelope. It was small and probably lived in woodland environments.

External links
Bovidae: Bovinae: Boselaphini
The Paleobiology Database

Prehistoric bovids
Miocene even-toed ungulates
Transitional fossils
Fossil taxa described in 1939
Prehistoric even-toed ungulate genera